The Price of Milk is a 2000 New Zealand romantic fantasy film. It was directed by New Zealand actor and director Harry Sinclair.

Plot
In rural New Zealand, a farmer, Rob (Karl Urban), gets engaged to his love, Lucinda (Danielle Cormack). However, Lucinda is worried about their relationship losing its spark and she continues pushing him away to try to keep the spark alive.

A string of quilt thefts have been occurring around town and when Lucinda finds hers, she is curious and reckless when she trades Rob's cows, worth NZ$400,000, for it. Rob is beyond words in his rage and loses his voice as he drives away, leaving Lucinda to worry for days before their planned wedding.

Reviews
 Puchon Fantasy Film Festival, Grand Prize 
 Tokyo Fantasy Film Festival, Grand Prize

References

External links
iofilm.co.uk– a review of The Price of Milk. 

2000 films
2000 romantic drama films
2000 drama films
2000s New Zealand films
New Zealand fantasy films
Films about farmers
Films set in New Zealand
Films set in 1969
Films directed by Harry Sinclair
New Zealand romantic drama films